Indian Creek is a tributary of Middle Island Creek,  long, in northern West Virginia in the United States.

Indian Creek's course is entirely in eastern Tyler County.  It rises near the common boundary of Tyler, Wetzel, and Doddridge counties and flows generally westward, through the unincorporated communities of Dale, Stringtown, Braden, Booher, and Big Moses.  It flows into Middle Island Creek from the east, a short distance south of the community of Blue.

See also
List of rivers of West Virginia

References 

Rivers of West Virginia
Rivers of Tyler County, West Virginia